The 2012–13 UNC Asheville Bulldogs men's basketball team represented the University of North Carolina at Asheville during the 2012–13 NCAA Division I men's basketball season. The Bulldogs, led by 17th year head coach Ed Biedenbach, played their home games at Kimmel Arena and were members of the South Division of the Big South Conference. They finished the season 16–16, 10–6 in Big South play to finish in third place in the South Division. They lost in the first round of the Big South tournament to Longwood.

Head coach Ed Biedenbach resigned at the end of the season to take an assistants job at UNC Wilmington.

Roster

Schedule

|-
!colspan=9| Exhibition

|-
!colspan=9| Regular season

|-
!colspan=9| 2013 Big South Conference men's basketball tournament

References

UNC Asheville Bulldogs men's basketball seasons
UNC Asheville
UNC Asheville Bulldogs men's basketball team
UNC Asheville Bulldogs men's basketball team